Alfred-Odilon Comtois (5 March 1876 – 26 August 1945) was a Canadian bishop who was Bishop of Trois-Rivières from 1934 to 1945. From Trois-Rivières, he was ordained in 1898. He was named bishop by Pius XI and he was consecrated by François-Xavier Cloutier. In 1945, Maurice Roy succeeded him as Bishop of Trois-Rivières, the year of his death.

References

1876 births
1945 deaths
20th-century Roman Catholic bishops in Canada
People from Trois-Rivières
Roman Catholic bishops of Trois-Rivières